André Bienvenue Roman (March 5, 1795–January 26, 1866) was Speaker of the Louisiana House of Representatives and the ninth U.S. Governor of Louisiana.

Early years
Born near Opelousas, the son of Jacques Étienne Roman of Opelousas, Louisiana, and Marie-Louise Patin, Roman's family later moved to St. James Parish and established a sugar cane plantation.  In 1815, Roman graduated from St. Mary College in Baltimore, Maryland.  The following year he married Aimée Françoise Parent. The couple would have eight children.  "A.B." was a member of an aristocratic French Creole family, who first immigrated from Grenoble, France to La Louisiane (today's Louisiana, USA), in 1741.
 
In 1818, Roman was elected to the Louisiana House of Representatives at the age of 23, and he was elected Speaker of the House in 1822, serving until 1826.  He was elected Parish Judge in St. James Parish, in 1826. He was again elected to the Louisiana House and was Speaker during the constitutional crisis following the death of Governor Pierre Derbigny in 1828.
 
In 1830, Roman was elected governor as a Whig candidate. At various points in the race his opponents include the flamboyant Bernard de Marigny, Martin Duralde, son-in-law of Henry Clay and relation of Governor William C.C. Claiborne, and former Governors Jacques Villeré (who died in March before the election) and Armand Beauvais, who resigned his position of Acting Governor to run.

Results of the 1830 special gubernatorial election:
André Roman 3,638;
W. S. Hamilton 2,701;
Armand Beauvais 1,478;
David Randall 463

First term as Governor

On January 31, 1831, Governor Roman took his oath of office during a time of storms, floods, economic depression, and epidemics. During these years of vigorous economic growth, yellow fever killed over 5,000 Louisianans, the number of banks in the state rose from 5 to 11, the Canal Bank built the New Basin Canal and the Pontchartrain Railroad began locomotive service in 1832.

Governor Roman is credited with establishing the state penitentiary system. The College of Jefferson opened in St. James Parish, and the College of Franklin opened in St. Landry Parish. The Louisiana Agricultural Society was organized with Governor Roman as its first president.

The South Carolina nullification controversy moved Roman and most of Louisiana to back President Andrew Jackson's stand on national authority over state nullification. The old Charity Hospital building on Canal Street was used as the State House, while 611 Royal Street was the official residence of the governor after the state government returned from Donaldsonville.

When his term was ending, Governor Roman sought re-election, but he was defeated by Edward Douglass White Sr., another Whig. In 1836, Roman opted to run for the United States Senate, but he was defeated by Alexandre Mouton.

In 1838, Roman again sought election as governor. His opponent this time was Denis Prieur, the Jacksonian Mayor of New Orleans who lived openly with his quadroon mistress. Roman beat Prieur 7,590 votes to 6,782.

Second term
On February 4, 1839, Roman resumed the governor's office stressing education and civic improvements. During this administration the first practical impetus on a public education system was established: 600 volumes of Charles Gayarré's Historical Essay on Louisiana were purchased and distributed among the Parish schools. Appropriations allowed copying of parish archives on Louisiana colonial history. Roman created the Office of State Engineer and advocated opening the passes at the mouth of the Mississippi River for better shipping.

Governor Roman served as the President of the New Orleans Drainage Company which drained the swamps behind the city. The Clinton and Port Hudson Railroad, which aided the cotton industry, was established, as well as an experimental farm in St. James Parish. During Governor Roman's second term, the state abolished imprisonment for debt.

With economic crises and panics looming, Roman struggled to maintain calm. He vetoed several new bank charters during the most volatile economic period in antebellum Louisiana (1841–42). The Bank Act of 1842 replaced the earlier easy credit system with a sounder, more restrictive policy.

Private citizen

After his second term in office, Governor Roman returned to his St. James Parish home but remained politically active.  In 1845, he was elected Delegate to the state constitutional convention and in 1848, Roman went to Europe as an agent for Citizens Bank and Consolidated Association of Planters for an extensions of bonds. He was again elected Delegate to the state constitutional convention of 1852.

In 1861, with the Civil War looming, Roman as a delegate to the Louisiana Secession convention opposed secession. The Convention chose secession and Governor Roman was selected along with John Forsyth and Martin J. Crawford to negotiate a peaceable separation from the United States, but United States Secretary of State William H. Seward refused to meet with them.

During the war Roman lost all his wealth and property.  On January 26, 1866, Roman died while walking down Dumaine Street. He had just accepted an appointment to the office of City Recorder of Deeds and Mortgages from Governor James Madison Wells.

References

Sources
 State of Louisiana - Biography
Encyclopedia Louisiana

External links
National Governors Association
Cemetery Memorial by La-Cemeteries

Members of the Louisiana House of Representatives
Speakers of the Louisiana House of Representatives
1795 births
1866 deaths
Governors of Louisiana
Louisiana Creole people
Louisiana Whigs
Whig Party state governors of the United States
19th-century American politicians